Miss Israel is a beauty pageant, organised for women of Israeli origin. 

In 1977 the title was awarded to Zehava Vardi.

Results

External links

1977 beauty pageants
1977 in Israel
Miss Israel